Ralph Worsley (by 1464 – 1529 or later), of Hamworthy and Wimborne Minster, Dorset, was an English politician.

Family
Worsley may have been the son of John Worsley of Dorset. By 1507, he had married a woman named Ellen.

Career
He was a Member (MP) of the Parliament of England for Poole in 1512.

References

15th-century births
16th-century deaths
English MPs 1512–1514
People from Wimborne Minster
People from Poole